The Collections Trust is an independent UK-based charity that works with museums, libraries, galleries and archives worldwide to improve the management and use of collections. It was established in February 1977 as the Museum Documentation Association (MDA) and re-launched as the Collections Trust in 2008. Its head office is in Shoreditch, London.

Mission and aims 

The Collections Trust is a registered charity (Registered No. 273984).  The charitable purposes were set out in 1977 and are:

 To promote the education of the public by the development of museums and similar organisations by all appropriate methods;
 To develop, promote, maintain and improve standards of collections and information management in museums, art galleries, heritage organisations and other collecting institutions;
 To provide services and resources which improve the standards and methods of collections management and use.

Work 

Standards and publications

The Collections Trust developed the SPECTRUM Standard – the Museum Collections Management Standard – in 1994. The standard details how to manage collections and what to do with artefacts at each stage of their lifecycle in a collection. The Standard is now in its fifth edition and is used by the majority of museums. It has been translated into several languages including Dutch and Flemish.

The organisation also produces collections management best practice guides and benchmarking tools. It has particular expertise in digital collections management and the use of new technology for museums, such as 3D imaging. Many of its resources are freely available on its website.

Events

The Collections Trust hosts a number of practical workshops and seminars for collections management professionals and an annual conference. At this conference the Collections Trust’s Awards are presented. Previous award winners include:

2012
 Collections Practice Award – Victoria & Albert Museum
 Collections on a Budget Award - Museum of British Surfing

2013
 Collections Practice Award - Royal Albert Memorial Museum & Art Gallery
 Collections on a Budget Award - East Grinstead Museum
 Participatory Practice Award - Beaney House of Art and Knowledge

2014
 Collections Practice Award - Museum of London 
 Collections on a Budget Award - Hayle Oral History Project 
 Participatory Practice Award - Public Catalogue Foundation
 Enterprise in Museums Award - Tyne & Wear Archives & Museums
 Collections Manager of the Year Award  - Jamie Everitt of the Norfolk Museums Service
 Young Collections Professional Award - Jenny Webb of The Lightbox

Funded projects

The Collections Trust works on many projects that are funded by Arts Council England and by the European Commission. It is currently managing 20m Euros worth of EC projects, including Athena Plus, Digital Cultural Heritage Roadmap for Preservation (DCH-RP)], EEXCESS, EU Collections Competencies Project (EUColComp)], Europeana Food and Drink and Europeana Inside. The Collections Trust leads the UK’s involvement in the Europeana project.

Key people 

Directors

 1977 Martin Porter
 19__ Andrew Roberts 
 1989 Wendy Sudbury
 1997 Louise Smith 
 2004 Nick Poole (CEO from 2008)
 2015 Kevin Gosling

Current board members

 Hadrian Ellory-van Dekker (Chair), Chair Arts Council England’s Accreditation Committee for museums and galleries.
 Rob Avann, General Manager of the Open University Students Association.
 Katie Childs, Head of Partnerships and Stakeholder Relations at the Imperial War Museums.
 Camilla Hampshire, Museums Manager and Cultural Lead at Exeter’s Royal Albert Memorial Museum and Art Gallery. 
 Jennifer Jones, Collections Development Officer at the Shakespeare Birthplace Trust. 
 Sarah Levitt, Head of Arts and Museums, Culture and Neighbourhood Services, Leicester City Council. 
 Chris Michaels, Digital Director at the National Gallery.
 Tonya Nelson, Head of Museums and Collections, University College London.
 Deborah Potter, Head of Conservation, Collection, Tate.
 Susan Raikes, Head of Learning and National Partnerships, The British Museum. 
 Rachael Rogers, Curator, Abergavenny Museum.
 Taniah Simpson, Assistant Collections Manager in the Registrar’s Office at The British Museum.
 Irene Walsh, former Managing Director, Deloitte Financial Advisory Services.

History 

The early team at the MDA was led by Martin Porter and included researchers Andrew Roberts (who later became head of the MDA) and Richard Light. Early achievements included the production of the Social History and Industrial Classification Scheme (SHIC) in 1983 (in partnership with the SHIC Working Party), the MDA Data Standard in 1991, and the SPECTRUM standard in 1994.

See also 

 Museums Computer Group
 UKOLN
 Museums Association
 Institute of Conservation

Notes

External links

Charities based in London
Museum associations and consortia
Shoreditch